Rajkumar Sahyogi is an Indian politician. He was elected to the Uttar Pradesh Legislative Assembly from Iglas in the 2019 by election as a member of the Bharatiya Janata Party. By-elections happen due to Rajvir Singh Diler elected to Parliament.

References

Living people
Bharatiya Janata Party politicians from Uttar Pradesh
People from Hathras district
Uttar Pradesh MLAs 2017–2022
Year of birth missing (living people)
Uttar Pradesh MLAs 2022–2027